Mahoney is a surname originally designating the descendants of Mathghamhain.

In the early 16th century, during the collapse of the O'Mahony's, three new breakaway dynastic families formed: MacMahon, Mahon and Mahoney (the latter bearing an earldom. Extinct c. 1815).

Notable people 

Alexander Mahoney (1947– ), New Zealand cricketer
Andries Mahoney (1985– ), South African rugby union player
Ann Mahoney (1976–), American television, film, and stage actress
Atholstan Mahoney (1908–1979), New Zealand rugby union player
Balls Mahoney (1972–2016), American professional wrestler
Bernard Joseph Mahoney (1875–1939), Roman Catholic Bishop of Sioux Falls
Bob Mahoney (1928–2000), American Major League Baseball pitcher
Brian Mahoney (disambiguation), multiple people 
Bryan Mahoney (disambiguation), multiple people 
Caitlin Mahoney (1990– ), American female volleyball player
Carolyn Mahoney (1946– ), American mathematician
Charles Mahoney (disambiguation), multiple people
Chris Mahoney (disambiguation), multiple people named Chris or Christopher 
Connor Mahoney (1997– ), English professional footballer
Cynthia L. Mahoney (1951–2006), American nun
Dan Mahoney (disambiguation), multiple people
Daniel Mahoney (disambiguation), multiple people
Dave Mahoney (1892–1947), Australian rules footballer
David Mahoney (1981– ), American soccer goalkeeper
David Mahoney (1987– ), British producer and performer
David J. Mahoney (1923–2000), American business leader, philanthropist and author
Dej Mahoney, British legal and business consultant
Dennis Mahony (1821–1879), American newspaper editor
Denzel Mahoney (1998– ), American professional basketball player
Edward Joseph Mahoney (1949–2019), American singer, songwriter and multi-instrumentalist
Ernestine Mahoney (1910–2000), American actress and photographer
Eugene T. Mahoney (1928-2004), American politician
Florence Mahoney (1929– ), Gambian Creole author
Francis Mahoney (disambiguation), multiple people
Frank Mahoney (disambiguation), multiple people
George Mahoney, American Medal of Honor recipient
George E. Mahoney (1867–1955), Wisconsin politician
George P. Mahoney 
Gerald Mahoney (1892–1955), Australian politician
Ike Mahoney (1901-1961), American football player
Jack Mahoney (disambiguation), multiple people
James E. Mahoney (1858–1926), American officer
James Patrick Mahoney (1927–1995), Canadian Catholic bishop
James Patrick Mahoney (New York bishop) (1925–2002), American Catholic bishop
Janet Mahoney, English actress
Janet Claire Mahoney, (1953– ), Australian actress
Jeremiah Mahoney (Medal of Honor) (1840–1902), American Medal of Honor recipient
Jeremiah T. Mahoney (1878–1970), American lawyer and judge 
Jerry Mahoney (disambiguation), multiple people
Jessie Callahan Mahoney (1887–1956)
Jim Mahoney
Jim Mahoney (umpire)
Joan Mahoney (1943– ), American legal scholar
Joanie Mahoney (1965– ), American politician
Jock Mahoney, American actor
Joe Mahoney (1987– ), professional baseball first baseman
John Mahoney (disambiguation), multiple people
Joseph Mahoney, Welsh professional rugby league footballer 
Josh Mahoney (1977– ), professional Australian rules footballer
Julie Mahoney (1978– ), Canadian fencer
Kevin Mahoney (1965–2011), American singer
Liam Mahoney (1987– ), professional Canadian football wide receiver
Louis Mahoney (1938–2020), Gambian-born British actor
Lynn Mahoney (born 1964), American university president
Maggie Mahoney (1922–2011), American film actress
Margaret A. Mahoney, American politician 
Marie Mahoney
Mark Mahoney, American tattoo artist
Mary Mahoney (1940–2021), Australian medical practitioner
Mary Eliza Mahoney 
Matthew Mahoney (disambiguation), multiple people
Maureen Mahoney
Megan Mahoney (1983– ), American professional basketball player
Merchant M. Mahoney, Canadian diplomat
Michael Mahoney (disambiguation), several people named Michael or Mike
Murphy Mahoney (2001–), English professional footballer
Neale Mahoney (1982–), American economist
Neil Mahoney (1906–1973), American professional baseball scout
Patrick Mahoney
Pat Mahoney (1929–2012), Canadian judge, politician, lawyer and businessman
Paul Mahoney (disambiguation), multiple people
Peter P. Mahoney (1848–1889), U.S. Representative from New York
Rebecca Hull (née Mahoney), (1983– ), New Zealand rugby union player
Reed Mahoney (1998- ), Australian rugby league player
Richard Mahoney (disambiguation), multiple people
Robert Mahoney (1921-2017), American politician
Rosemary Mahoney (1961– ), American non-fiction writer
Simon Mahoney, British author
Stephen Mahoney, American football player and coach
Steve Mahoney, Canadian politician
Suzanne Somers (née Mahoney), American actor
Thomas Mahoney (disambiguation), multiple people
Tim Mahoney (disambiguation), several people named Tim or Timothy
Tony Mahoney (1893–1924), American baseballer
Tony Mahoney (1959– ), English professional football striker
Travis Mahoney (1990– ), Australian medley and backstroke swimmer
Ule Mahoney (1917– ), Panamanian baseballer
Victoria Mahoney, American filmmaker and actress
Walter J. Mahoney (1908–1982), New York politician
Will Mahoney (1894-1967), American-born vaudevillian performer and stage actor
William Mahoney (disambiguation), several people
Willis Mahoney (1895–1968), American politician

Fictional characters 
Breathless Mahoney of Dick Tracy
Carey Mahoney of the Police Academy franchise
Mrs. Mahoney of Kim Possible
Denise Mahoney of Scrubs

See also
Mahony
O'Mahony
Beck-Mahoney Sorceress, racing staggerwing biplane
Bruce-Mahoney Trophy, Californian inter-school sports trophy
Eugene T. Mahoney State Park, near Ashland, Nebraska
Lescher & Mahoney, American architectural firm
Mahoney tables, set of reference tables used in architecture
Segal McCambridge Singer & Mahoney, U.S.-based law firm
Warren and Mahoney, New Zealand multi-disciplinary architectural practice
W. P. Mahoney House in Kingman, Arizona